Husaybah is a city on the Euphrates river in the Al-Qa'im District of Al-Anbar province in Iraq, adjacent to the Al-Qa'im border crossing to Syria.

Climate
In Husaybah, there is a desert climate. Most rain falls in the winter. The Köppen-Geiger climate classification is BWh. About  of precipitation falls annually.

See also
 Battle of Husaybah (2004)

Populated places in Al Anbar Governorate
Populated places on the Euphrates River